Kathleen G. Evison (born January 16, 1963) is an American former actress. She is best known for playing Lonnie Henderson in season 2-3 of seaQuest DSV.

Biography
Evison's father was employed by the National Park Service so she spent most of her young life in national parks all across the United States. To finance her college education (she graduated cum laude from the University of California, Davis with a degree in rhetoric) she worked as a model, including appearances all over the world in television commercials and magazines, including women's health magazines like Self, Shape and the magazine Seventeen. The magazine modeling led to TV commercials, and those led to Kathy's first television acting part, which was in The Heights in 1992 (in the episode "Natalie"), before she won a regular role in the TV series seaQuest DSV in 1994.

One of Kathy's guest appearances on Diagnosis: Murder, (the episode "Blood Ties"), was filmed as a pilot episode for a spin off series called Whistlers which would have starred her and Zoe McLellan. Ultimately the show wasn't picked up by the network.

Kathy lives in Los Angeles, California, with her husband Randy Katz and two children.

Selected filmography
 The Heights (TV) (1992) (episode: "Natalie") .... Natalie
 Beverly Hills, 90210 (TV) (3 episodes) (1994) .... Kathy Fisher
 seaQuest DSV (TV) (1994–96) .... Lieutenant JG Lonnie Henderson (main role)
 The New Adventures of Flipper (TV) (1996) (episode: "Sea Horse") .... Emma Phelps
 Highlander: The Series (1996) (TV) (episode: "Haunted") .... Jennifer Hill
 Diagnosis: Murder (TV) (3 episodes) (1996–99) .... Det. Amy Devlin
 The Pretender (TV) (episode: "Survival") (1999) .... Lt. Molly Kimbrell
 7th Heaven (TV) (1999) (episode: "Yak Sada") .... Jessica Tanner
 Murder, She Wrote: A Story to Die For (TV movie) (2000) .... Penny Ryan

References

External links

Kathy Evison Online

1963 births
Living people
American television actresses
Actresses from Nevada
University of California, Davis alumni
People from Boulder City, Nevada
21st-century American women